Lee Dae-yeon (born November 13, 1964) is a South Korean actor.

Filmography

Film

Television series

Theater

Awards and nominations

References

External links 
 Lee Dae-yeon at JR Entertainment 
 
 
 

1964 births
Living people
20th-century South Korean male actors
21st-century South Korean male actors
South Korean male television actors
South Korean male film actors